Mette is a female given name of Scandinavian origin. It's descended from the name Margaret and is also considered a variant of Matilda. Notable people with the name include:

Mette Marit, Crown Princess of Norway
Mette Pedersen (born 1973), Danish badminton player
Mette Sørensen (born 1975), Danish badminton player
Mette Abildgaard, Danish politician
Mette Andersen, Danish cyclist
Mette Koefoed Bjørnsen (1920–2008), Danish author, conciliator and economist
Mette Henriette, Norwegian performing artist and composer
Mette Bergmann, Norwegian discus thrower
Mette Frederiksen, Danish Prime Minister
Mette Jacobsen, Danish swimmer
Mette Madsen (1924–2015), Danish politician and writer
Mette Oxvang (born 1937), Danish high jumper
Mette Towley, American actress and dancer
Mette Schjoldager, Danish badminton player
Mette Veiseth, Danish model, Miss Norway in 1987
Mette Lindberg, vocalist for Danish psychedelic pop band The Asteroids Galaxy Tour

See also

Feminine given names
Given names derived from gemstones